Rajshri Deshpande is an Indian actress and activist. She gained international recognition with her portrayal of  Laxami in Pan Nalin's Angry Indian Goddesses. This was followed by the titular role of Durga in Sanal Kumar Sasidharan's Sexy Durga, which won the Hivos Toger Award at the Rotterdam Film Festival. She also plays the role of Manju in BBC One's McMafia. Deshpande received critical acclaim for her performance as Subhadra in the Netflix series Sacred Games, directed by Anurag Kashyap. She played the role of Ismat Chughtai in Nandita Das's film Manto.

Early life
Rajshri Deshpande was born in a working-class family in Aurangabad, Maharashtra. She is the youngest of three siblings. She has an undergraduate degree in law from Symbiosis Law School and a postgraduate degree in advertising from Symbiosis International University. She got into the advertising industry to support herself but soon found her calling in acting. She also has a diploma in filmmaking from Whistling Woods International in Mumbai.

Career
Deshpande made her Bollywood debut in 2012 with a small role in the Aamir Khan starrer Talaash. She then moved to television and appeared in Kuch Toh Log Kahenge and 24: India in 2013. She returned to the big screen with a small role in Salman Khan's Kick. She also appeared in the Malayalam film Haram in 2015, where she had a double role. In Hindi cinema, it was the portrayal of Laxami in Pan Nalin's Angry Indian Goddesses that provided her with a bigger platform. The film received the 1st Runner Up – People's Choice Award at the Toronto International Film Festival and the People's Choice Award at the Rome Film Festival.  Deshpande played the leading role in Sanal Kumar Shashidharan's film Sexy Durga in 2017. The film won the Hivos Toger Award at the Rotterdam Film Festival.

She made her digital debut with BBC One's McMafia, directed by James Watkins, in January 2018. Deshpande was also seen in the Netflix show Sacred Games, directed by Anurag Kashyap. In it, she played the character of Subhadra and was praised for her role as the wife of Nawazuddin Siddiqui's character. A scandal arose when she was accused of being a porn star by some viewers, as the show included a nude sex scene. The actress replied that she hadn't done anything wrong. She later portrayed Ismat Chughtai in Nandita Das's Manto.

Social service
Deshpande has devoted time to a number of humanitarian causes. After the 2015 Nepal earthquake, she worked with an international NGO at one of the villages. Also in 2015, she adopted a drought-prone village in the Marathwada region of Maharashtra called Pandhari and organized a rainwater harvesting project, built toilets, conducted health checkups and community motivation camps, and built an eco-sensitive school in the same village. Encouraged by the success and social participation in the first village, she adopted one more village in the region. In 2018, she created the Nabhangan Foundation to broaden her efforts towards sustainable village development. In the past few years, she has been a core member of Citizens for Tomorrow, actress Juhi Chawla's NGO against plastic pollution.

Filmography

Film

Television

References

External links

 
 

Living people
Actresses from Mumbai
People from Aurangabad, Maharashtra
Indian film actresses
Actresses in Hindi cinema
Actresses in Malayalam cinema
Actresses in Marathi cinema
Actresses in Urdu cinema
Indian television actresses
Indian soap opera actresses
Actresses in Hindi television
21st-century Indian actresses
1982 births